Trepobates becki is a species of water strider in the family Gerridae. It is found in Arizona and southern California in the United States, south throughout much of Mexico.

References

Trepobatinae
Insects described in 1932